Sindhuja Rajamaran  became India's youngest CEO and 2D animator at the age of 14. She is reported to hold a Guinness World Record for becoming the youngest CEO in India of a Chennai-based animation company called Seppan, which was founded in 2010 and had ten employees in 2014.

Sindhuja also serves as brand ambassador for Corel Software Company, which certified her as youngest creator of digital cartoons. She was awarded the young entrepreneur of the year 2018 by South Indian Startup Award in Chennai.

References

External links
 http://in.finance.yahoo.com/photos/meet-the-world-s-youngest-ceo-s-slideshow/meet-world-s-youngest-ceo-s-photo-1392101325013.html

Indian animators
Indian chief executives
Living people
1997 births
Indian child businesspeople
Indian women chief executives
Businesspeople from Chennai
21st-century Indian businesspeople
21st-century Indian businesswomen
Businesswomen from Tamil Nadu
Indian women animators